Khaled Mattawa (born 1964) is a Libyan poet, and a renowned Arab-American writer, he is also a leading literary translator, focusing on  translating Arabic poetry into English. He works as an Assistant professor of creative writing at the University of Michigan, Ann Arbor, Michigan, United States, where he currently lives and writes.

Background
Khaled Mattawa was born in Benghazi, the second largest city in Libya where he spent his childhood and early teens. In 1979 he emigrated to the United States. He lived in the south for many years, finishing high school in Louisiana at St. Paul's School and completing bachelor's degrees in political science and economics at the University of Tennessee at Chattanooga. He went on to earn an MA in English and an MFA in creative writing from Indiana University where he taught creative writing. He was a professor of English and Creative Writing at California State University, Northridge. He received his PhD from Duke University in 2009.

His work has appeared in Poetry, The Kenyon Review, Blackbird, Crazyhorse, New England Review, Callaloo, Beloit Poetry Journal, Poetry East, Michigan Quarterly Review, The Iowa Review, Black Warrior Review and The Pushcart Prize XIX, The Best American Poetry 1997 anthologies.

Khaled Mattawa  began writing poetry in the late 1980s. His first collection of poems was published 1995. He then started working on translating Arabic poetry of renowned Arab poets into English, his first translation Questions and Their Retinue: Selected Poems of Iraqi poet Hatif Janabi was published in 1996. He contributed and edited two Anthologies on Arab American Literature.
 
Khaled Mattawa is a contributing editor for Banipal magazine, the leading independent magazine of contemporary Arab literature translated into English. He was president of Radius of Arab American Writers organization RAWI.

In 2014, he was elected a Chancellor of the Academy of American Poets. In 2019 he was a contributor to A New Divan: A Lyrical Dialogue between East and West.

Awards and recognition
Khaled Mattawa has received a MacArthur Foundation Fellowship in 2014, an Academy of American Poets award, the PEN Award for Poetry in Translation in 2003 and 2011, a 1997 Guggenheim Fellowship, the Alfred Hodder fellowship from Princeton University 1995-1996, an NEA translation grant, and two Pushcart prizes.

Mattawa has also won the Arkansas Arabic Translation Prize and the Banipal Prize. These are the two major awards for translation of Arabic literature into English. He won the former for his translation of Hatif Janabi's poetry and the latter for Selected Poems of Adunis. The only other person to have won both the Arkansas and the Banipal awards is Samah Selim.

Bibliography

Poetry 
 Tocqueville New Issues, 2010  
 Amorisco Ausable Press, 2008,  
 
 Ismailia Eclipse The Sheep Meadow Press, 1995, 
Contributor to The New Divan: A Lyrical Dialogue Between East and West

Translation from Arabic 
 Adonis: Selected Poems (The Margellos World Republic of Letters), Yale 2010,  (shortlisted for the 2011 Griffin Poetry Prize)
 Amjad Nasser, (2009). Shepherd of solitude: selected poems, 1979-2004, Banipal Books,  
Joumana Haddad, (2008). Invitation to a Secret Feast, Tupelo Press,  
Iman Mirsal, (2008). These are not oranges, my love: selected poems, Sheep Meadow Press,  
Maram Al-Massri, (2004). A Red Cherry on a White-Tiled Floor: Selected Poems by  Bloodaxe Books, UK, 2004, ; Copper Canyon Press, USA, 2007 
 
Saadi Youssef, (2002). Without An Alphabet, Without A Face: Selected Poems Graywolf Press,  
 Fadhil Al Azzawi, (1997). In Every Well A Joseph Is Weeping, poems of Quarterly Review of Books

Anthologies of Arab American Literature 
 Dinarzad's Children: An Anthology of Arab American Fiction, University of Arkansas Press, 2004 
 Post Gibran: Anthology of New Arab American Writing, Kitab, 1999,

Essays 

 How Long Have You Been With Us?: Essays on Poetry. (University of Michigan Press, 2016).

See also 
 English literature
 Libyan literature
 Arabic literature
 List of Arab American writers

References

External links
 Selected poems from Web Del Sol
 An interview with Khaled Mattawa on MELUS by Salah D. Hassan
 "A Conversation with Khaled Mattawa" with  Jeff Lodge and Patty Paine, Blackbird v6n2.
 University of Michigan MFA Faculty
 Griffin Poetry Prize biography of Khaled Mattawa, including video clip
"Conversation: Libyan Poet Khaled Mattawa", PBS Newshour, March 1, 2011 
"Ali Ahmida & Khaled Mattawa", Charlie Rose, February 22, 2011 

1964 births
American people of Libyan descent
Libyan emigrants to the United States
University of Michigan faculty
Libyan poets
Living people
MacArthur Fellows
People from Benghazi
American male poets
University of Tennessee at Chattanooga alumni
Indiana University alumni
California State University, Northridge faculty
Literary translators